William Kroyer is an American director of animation and computer graphics commercials, short films, movie titles, and theatrical films. He and Jerry Rees were the main animators for the CGI sequences in Tron. He is currently the head of the Digital Arts department at Lawrence and Kristina Dodge College of Film and Media Arts at Chapman University.

Career
Kroyer began his animation career in 1975 by working in a small commercial studio. In 1977, he finally ended up at Disney Studios as animator on The Fox and the Hound but left Disney later because he did not want to work on The Black Cauldron. It was then he met future Tron director Steven Lisberger, who was working on Animalympics. After Animalympics was completed, Lisberger developed Tron and sold it to Disney.

After Tron was finished, Kroyer decided to stay with computer animation instead of traditional animation and worked at Robert Abel and Associates and Digital Productions. In 1986, he and his wife, Sue, started Kroyer Films to combine computer animation with hand-drawn animation. They made a short film titled Technological Threat; it was nominated for an Academy Award in 1988 and preserved by the Academy Film Archive in 2008.

After Technological Threat was finished, Kroyer decided to stay with computer animation films for such as Jetsons: The Movie and Rugrats in Paris: The Movie.

He directed Computer Warriors: The Adventure Begins in 1990 and then FernGully: The Last Rainforest in 1992. He was originally set to direct Quest for Camelot but left the project over creative differences.

Soon after he joined Rhythm and Hues Studios as Senior Animation Director and supervised the CGI animation for films such as Garfield, Scooby Doo, Cats & Dogs and The Flintstones in Viva Rock Vegas.

In early 2009 he began teaching at Chapman University's Dodge College of Film and Media Arts in Orange, California.

In 2017 he and his wife Susan became the first couple to receive the June Foray Award from the international Animation Society for their "contributions to the art and industry of animation."

Filmography 
Rugrats in Paris: The Movie (CG animation director: Rhythm & Hues)
The Flintstones in Viva Rock Vegas (CG animation director: Rhythm & Hues)
The Green Mile (animation supervisor: Rhythm & Hues)
FernGully: The Last Rainforest (director)
Computer Warriors: The Adventure Begins (writer, director)
Jetsons: The Movie (computer animator: vehicle animation)
Technological Threat (writer, director, producer, computer animation)
Starchaser: The Legend of Orin (computer animation planner, key animator)
Tron (production storyboards, computer image choreography)
Animalympics (animation director, animator)

See also 
Kroyer Films
Rhythm & Hues
Robert Abel and Associates
Digital Productions
Silicon Graphics
Wavefront Technologies
Alias Research
Symbolics Graphics Division
Apple Macintosh
Softimage 3D
Cinetron Computer Systems
CSRG, UC Berkeley

References

External links

 
 Creating the Memories by William Kroyer

20th-century births
Living people
American animators
American animated film directors
Year of birth missing (living people)